Russell House and Store is a 19th-century historic building in Dale City, Virginia. A historical marker was erected at the house by the Hechinger Company in 1992, on behalf of the Prince William County Historical Commission.

References

External links 
 Russell House and Store at the Historical Marker Database

Houses in Prince William County, Virginia
Restaurants in Virginia